Moghan (also Romanized as Moghān) is a village in Howmeh Rural District, in the Central District of Shahrud County, Semnan Province, Iran. At the 2006 census, its population was 1,631, in 453 families.

References 

Populated places in Shahrud County